Gonda is a town in Aligarh district in the Indian state of Uttar Pradesh.

Geography
Gonda - The rapidly growing town is a commercial and educational hub for 80–100 villages located in this region (Lagasma).  It is well connected by road and is a junction of Mathura-Raya-Gorai-Aligarh and Agra-Hathras-Iglas-Khair-Delhi road.  It is situated at 21 km from G.T.Road at Aligarh, 23 km from Aligarh Junction Railway Station and 41 km from Taj Expressway at Tappal.

Gonda is developed in last 25 years to great extent across Iglas-Khair Road. It extends from ढाड़ (dhand) to नयाबास (towards khair).  However, there is limited good development seen on Gonda -Aligarh roads up to water tank. At a distance of 21 km from Gonda is Aligarh city. The Road from Gonda to Aligarh is called Gonda-Aligarh Road. Hopefully in Future Gonda may be Stretched to Village Mangarhi. Another Name of Gonda Area is Lagasama.
Murwar is a village situated 5 km from Gonda on the Gonda Iglas Road (Also called Khair - Hathras road). This road also connects Khair and Hathras. Gonda is one of the upcoming blocks of Aligarh district.  The block was at an out side of village near bijalighar.

Demographics
 India census, Gonda had a population of about 7550 as per 2001 census.

Nearby villages
 Uttampur
 Mangarhi
 Basai

References

Villages in Aligarh district